Erick Ombija Ngoja (born 7 June 1994) is a Kenyan striker currently in the ranks of Kenyan Premier League side Nairobi City Stars.

Club career

Ombija turned out for Gor Mahia Youth before heading out to second-tier and coast-based side Coast Stima. 

After a season he was back at Gor Mahia, the senior side, for the 2018-19 season but was to return to Coast Stima on loan for the season, from where he went on to top scorer in the league with 17 goals in 25 games. 

He then joined Nairobi City Stars for the 2020-21 FKF Premier League season on a two-year deal.

References

External links
 

Living people
1994 births
Nairobi City Stars players
Gor Mahia F.C. players
Kenyan Premier League players
Kenyan footballers